New Port South is a 2001 American drama film. It was released on September 7, 2001. The film is set in the fictional town of New Port, near Chicago. It stars Will Estes, Todd Field, and Blake Shields, was written by James Hughes and directed by Kyle Cooper. The soundtrack is by Telefon Tel Aviv.

James Hughes is the son of John Hughes, who produced the movie (one of only two in John Hughes' career that he produced without writing himself—the other was Only the Lonely). It was also the last movie where John Hughes served as producer before his death.

Plot
Will Maddox (Blake Shields) has a theory about students not liking the idea of school and authority and thinking that it is a prison. He tests this theory and examines the boundaries of authority and his friendships. A few years before, a student, John Stanton (Michael Shannon) was committed to an insane asylum, for reasons unknown to most everybody except the principal. One day he escapes, releasing everyone else from the asylums around. Maddox sees this defiance which is the start of his anarchy. Maddox wants to "help him" and understand him more so they start a correspondence and Stanton tells him what to do and how to do it. This is includes the erasing of student grades, posting posters/fliers, and locking part of the student body in a room, among other things. Maddox gets his friends involved and challenges authority and gets most of the school behind him, including an administrator for a while. He is so consumed with creating chaos and disorder that his friends start to see the destruction, but they have to save themselves, and him before he can take complete control over the school.

Cast
 Todd Field as Mr. Walsh
 Will Estes as Chris
 Blake Shields as Will Maddox
 Kevin Christy as Clip
 Melissa George as Amanda
 Raymond J. Barry as Edwards
 Gabriel Mann as Mike Wilson
 Brad Eric Johnson as Knox
 Lamar Benson as Football Player
 Nick Sandow as Armstrong
 Michael Shannon as John Stanton

Filming locations
 Libertyville High School, Libertyville, Illinois (and the city of Libertyville itself).
 Lake Bluff, Illinois

Home media
A region 1 DVD of the film was released on March 12, 2002.

References

External links
 
 
 

2001 films
2001 directorial debut films
2001 drama films
American drama films
Touchstone Pictures films
Films produced by John Hughes (filmmaker)
2000s English-language films
2000s American films
English-language drama films